Manfred Nepp is a German track cyclist. He has won the World and European Master Championship several times.

References

External links
World Masters Track Championships - CMM

German male cyclists
Living people
Place of birth missing (living people)
Sportspeople from Krefeld
Cyclists from North Rhine-Westphalia
1941 births